100 manat - is the one of banknotes in Azerbaijan and Turkmenistan.

Features of banknotes

Banknotes in circulation

See also 

Azerbaijani manat
Turkmenistani manat

References

External links
 Azerbaijani bank-notes

Currencies of Azerbaijan
Currencies of Turkmenistan
One-hundred-base-unit banknotes